The Solar MS-1 was an American prototype all-metal sesquiplane airliner built in 1930.

Design and development
Its wings were braced to each other with warren truss-style struts. The lower stub wings carried the well separated legs of the fixed undercarriage. The fuselage was of rectangular cross-section and featured a fully enclosed flight deck and passenger cabin. The tail was of conventional design with strut-braced stabilizers and carrying a fixed tailwheel. Construction was of metal throughout with corrugated skins, and was powered by a single  Pratt & Whitney Wasp radial engine in the nose.

Operational service
The MS-1 flew for the first time registered as X258V on 21 January 1930 with Doug Kelly at the controls. Kelly described it as "one of the finest closed planes I have ever flown", and Charles Lindbergh also praised the MS-1 when he flew it a few days later. Despite this, the airlines did not order the type, although Northwest Airways and ten other airlines considered, and rejected buying examples due to the effect that the onset of the Great Depression was having on their traffic volumes. A  record flight from Los Angeles, California to Tokyo was planned, but never happened.
The high point was a  transcontinental flight over 25 states that the president of Solar took with his entire family, including his wife and three children, aged 9, 7 and 3, which attracted considerable interest from the media who dubbed it the "flying nursery". A purchasing agent for a major airline then promised a substantial order, but dropped dead of a heart attack the day the order was to be signed, and his replacement called off the deal. Solar made the prototype available for charter flights for a while, but in 1931 sold it to an operator in Mexico who used it to transport coffee beans. On the Mexican register as XB-AFK, the MS-1 was destroyed in a crash in 1936. Solar would never build another aircraft, turning to saucepans to survive the depression, and later stainless steel exhaust shrouds.

Specifications (Solar MS-1)

See also

References

Citations

Bibliography
 
 
 
 

 
 

1930s United States airliners
Sesquiplanes
Single-engined tractor aircraft
Aircraft first flown in 1930